Karlsberg Bulgaria is the Bulgarian subsidiary of the Carlsberg Group. Since 2002, it has owned the Shumensko Brewery in the city of Shumen, where it brews mainly Shumensko pivo (Шуменско пиво).

The company brews two Bulgarian brands – Shumensko and Pirinsko, and five licensed brands – Tuborg, Carlsberg, Holsten, Budweiser Budvar and Somersby cider.

External links 
 Carlsberg Bulgaria brands
 Shumensko website

Food and drink companies established in 1882
Breweries in Bulgaria
Shumen